Princess Ravonna Lexus Renslayer is a fictional character appearing in American comic books published by Marvel Comics. First appearing in Avengers #23 (December 1965), and created by writer Stan Lee and artist Don Heck, Ravonna is a princess and assassin who serves as the lover and successor of Kang the Conqueror and their younger self Kid Immortus. The character has been depicted as both a supervillain and an antihero. After being granted the ability of retroactive reincarnation, an incarnation of Ravonna becomes Moon Knight.

Ravonna Renslayer appears in the Marvel Cinematic Universe (MCU) / Disney+ series Loki (2021), portrayed by Gugu Mbatha-Raw.

Publication history

Ravonna first appeared in Avengers #23 (December 1965) and was created by Stan Lee and Don Heck.

Fictional character biography
Ravonna Lexus Renslayer was the daughter of King Carelius (a puppet ruler of an unrevealed kingdom of Kang the Conqueror's in the 40th century). Ravonna first met Kang when he attempted to annex her time era into his empire. Kang loved Ravonna, but she hated him due to his attempt to conquer the kingdom. While the kingdom threatened rebellion, Kang let it be in the hope of winning the princess Ravonna's hand in marriage. Eventually, however, outright rebellion broke out, and as Kang was on the verge of winning the battle, he brought the Avengers there to witness his triumph. He hoped to defeat them and then marry Ravonna. Finally his army attacked the kingdom at his signal. One of his generals, Baltag, rebelled against him after he did not execute Ravonna, as he had done to the rulers of other conquered kingdoms. Kang then enlisted the aid of the Avengers to overthrow Baltag. He also enlisted the aid of citizens of the city, and, after stealing weaponry, the rebellion went ahead. Kang gained access to a chamber which could only be opened by the sound of his heartbeat, and activated a device that destroyed all the weaponry of his rebelling army. He released Ravonna from her dungeon, revealing he really loved her. However, Baltag attempted to shoot Kang as he sent the Avengers back to their own time, and Ravonna, realizing she loved Kang, threw herself in front of the blast, and fell into a deathlike coma, after which the general was executed.

Kang preserved her in stasis for a time, but when he played a game with the Grandmaster in a tournament of champions, to gain the power to free Ravonna and kill the Avengers, he only partially won, and chose in anger to try to kill the Avengers instead. He failed due to the presence of the Black Knight, losing his chance to save Ravonna; the Grandmaster had only granted Kang the power of death over the Avengers, and the Black Knight was presently not a member of the team. A temporal counterpart of Ravonna was later revealed to be a consort of Kang, and later learned to be a confederate of Immortus in his scheme to defeat Kang and destroy the Kang divergents. Kang rescued her from the moment before death due to the devices of Immortus when he was thrown into Limbo (later it was revealed this was due to mental manipulation), then learned this had created an alternate reality in which he was slain. He begins to destroy divergents of himself, not realizing this is part of a plan by Immortus. Ravonna does not alert Kang when the paralysis beam he is using to hold the Avengers is overloading due to the strength of Hercules, enabling the Avengers to escape. She then holds a Kang divergent double at gunpoint, and tells him if he really loves her he must not kill the other Kang. He refuses this and she lets him leave. That divergent is killed as his weapon was booby-trapped by the other Kang. Ravonna tells the other Kang that Immortus was all that was ever good in Kang as Immortus reveals himself. In a flashback, it was revealed that the real Ravonna was rescued by the Grandmaster, who revived her despite Kang's choice out of curiosity and told her of the choice Kang had made. She was embittered at Kang for not saving her when he had the chance, and she swore revenge on Kang.

She became a subversive and assassin. She appeared to Doctor Druid in visions in a scheme to enlist his aid in acquiring the deadliest weapon in the omniverse. Assuming the guise of Avengers foe Nebula, she attempted to infiltrate the Council of Cross-Time Kangs. She completed her mental subjugation of Doctor Druid, and directed him to take over leadership of the Avengers. She used Druid to help her ensorcel the Avengers to accompany her to the center of a timestorm to retrieve the great weapon. She was ultimately thwarted by the Avengers and three Cross-Time Kangs, and fell into the timestorm with Druid. As Nebula, she attempted to enlist the aid of the Fantastic Four to free her. She appeared in a vision to the Human Torch, and mind-controlled the Invisible Woman. She attempted to steal the Ultimate Nullifier, but was thwarted by the Fantastic Four. She eventually escaped the timestorm to Lincoln, Nebraska in 1961 where she was thwarted by a rejuvenated Doctor Druid.

Still later, she vainly attempted to enthrall Doctor Druid again. She convinced Druid to help her investigate Kang's 20th Century stronghold. Taking the name Temptress, she met the Fantastic Four, and used their time-sled to enter Chronopolis. She then fought openly with the prime Kang after taking on a guise as Terminatrix in a personal duel, a battle which ended with Kang apparently sacrificing himself to save her in the same manner she once had him. She became ruler of Chronopolis with his defeat.

After ruling Kang's kingdom for a time, and becoming bored, she revived Kang — and stabbed him through the heart. She later revived him again, properly, and the two became lovers until Kang himself became bored and left to reassume his earlier identity of Rama-Tut and battle his younger self.

She was reported deceased in the destruction of Chronopolis, Kang's extra-temporal kingdom, in Avengers Forever.

A younger  Ravonna is later seen in the company of a younger Kang, Nate "Kid Immortus" Richards, providing information to Doctor Doom regarding the Future Foundation. In the solo series Kang the Conqueror, Kang rewrites history by manipulating a younger version of himself to go through all of his previous identities into becoming the purest form of would-be conqueror, resurrecting Ravonna by giving her the ability of reincarnation: having the same name and soul across different races, species and genders intersecting with Kang's personal timeline across the past, present, and future, with the series focusing on a particular Ravonna as Moon Knight.

Powers and abilities
Ravonna has a gifted intellect, but other than superhuman durability she has no superhuman powers. She is a formidable hand-to-hand combatant, and has mastery of various types of exotic weaponry. She also has mastery of a vast array of futuristic technology.  She has received advanced schooling in the arts and sciences of the 41st Century.

She wears body armor of an unknown composition, and uses various futuristic technology including vibro-knives, concussion blasters, and shape-shifting technology enabling her to alter her appearance at will.

In other media

Television

 Ravonna appears in The Avengers: Earth's Mightiest Heroes, voiced by Cindy Robinson. In the episode "Meet Captain America", she is exposed to temporal energy that was rewriting Kang's timeline, putting her into a deathlike coma as she slowly faded from existence. In "The Kang Dynasty", after Kang travels back in time to attack the Avengers, the Wasp stumbles on Ravonna's stasis area and gets her allies to stand down amidst their fight with Kang. Following this, Mister Fantastic, Hank Pym, and several of Earth's best scientific minds work to save Ravonna.
 Judge Ravonna Renslayer appears in Loki, portrayed by Gugu Mbatha-Raw. This version is a time variant of Ohio school vice principal Rebecca Tourminet who was pulled from her native timeline by He Who Remains, had her memories erased, and was made a Hunter and later Judge for the Time Variance Authority (TVA).

Film
Ravonna, based on her MCU counterpart, appears in The Simpsons short film The Good, the Bart, and the Loki, voiced by Dawnn Lewis.

Video games
Ravonna appears in Lego Marvel Super Heroes 2, voiced by Kate O'Sullivan. While this version is still Kang's mate following her realm being conquered, she secretly leaks information to the Avengers to undermine Kang. Following his defeat, Ravonna uses his time crystal to regress him to an infant before promising the Avengers she will return Chronopolis's components back to their respective places in space and time once Kang's remaining forces are defeated. In a post-credits scene, Ravonna as Terminatrix appears in Manhattan with Cosmo the Spacedog, the Man-Thing, the Supreme Intelligence, and an elderly Kang to warn Captain America, Captain Marvel, and Iron Man about a new threat.

References

External links
 

Characters created by Don Heck
Characters created by Stan Lee
Comics characters introduced in 1965
Fictional assassins in comics
Fictional murderers
Fictional princesses
Marvel Comics female supervillains